Lese may refer to:

People
 Grigore Leșe (born 1954), Romanian musician

Places
 Leše, Litija, Slovenia
 Leše, Prevalje, Slovenia
 Leše, Tržič, Slovenia
 Lese River, Democratic Republic of the Congo

Other
 Lese language

See also
 Lèse-majesté